Vatimi Tidara Tuinasakea Kaunitawake Rayalu is a Fijian politician, and Cabinet Minister. He is a member of the People's Alliance.

Rayalu is a former civil servant who worked as Deputy Permanent secretary for the Ministry of Agriculture.

He contested the 2022 Fijian general election as a PA candidate and was elected with 2072 votes. On 24 December 2022 he was appointed Minister for Agriculture and Waterways in the coalition government of Sitiveni Rabuka.

References

Living people
Fijian civil servants
People's Alliance (Fiji) politicians
Members of the Parliament of Fiji
Agriculture ministers of Fiji
Year of birth missing (living people)